Charles "Red" Farmer (born October 15, 1932) is a former NASCAR race car driver. He is a member of the Alabama Gang.

Racing career
His first race was at Opa-locka Speedway near Miami, Florida in a 1934 Ford in 1948. He became famous as a member of the Alabama Gang and he considered his hometown to be Hueytown, Alabama. Estimates of Farmer's career victories range from 700 to 900 victories, most occurring in the late 1950s and early 60's. He raced 36 NASCAR Cup Series races from 1953 to 1975. He won numerous championships at local tracks. Before racing in the Grand National series, he raced modified stock cars in the northeast. He was one of the first to transition from the modified series to the early Grand National Series. He was the NASCAR National Late Model Sportsman champion (later Xfinity Series) for three consecutive years from 1969 to 1971. Farmer's best finish in NASCAR's top division was fourth at both the 1972 Talladega 500, and the 1968 Middle Georgia 500 near Macon, Georgia). He entered so few Cup races because he was content to run primarily in the Late Model Sportsman Series. He was named NASCAR's most popular driver four times. Farmer raced in the white and gold number 97 car. In the mid-60's, however, Farmer raced a white, gold, and red Ford Fairlane, number F-97.

He was Davey Allison's crew chief in the Busch Series.

Farmer has retained his skills as a driver in spite of his age. He competed in two Busch Grand National races in 1992, and the season opening ARCA event at Daytona in 1993. In June 2005, Farmer, nearly aged 80, turned heads in winning a heat over current NASCAR Sprint Cup stars, and finished 8th in the feature during the Sprint Prelude to the Dream at Eldora Speedway, owned by Tony Stewart.

As of 2022, Farmer still regularly competes in a late model at Talladega Short Track, a 1/3 mile oval dirt track in Eastaboga, Alabama located near the Talladega Superspeedway. His grandson, Lee Burdett, also races there.

Farmer's house, race shop, race hauler, and dirt late model were damaged by a tornado on March 25, 2021.

Awards
His accolades are numerous, being a member of five halls of fame. Farmer was named one of the 50 Greatest Drivers in NASCAR history in 1998. He was a member of the first Class of Inductees into the Talladega-Texaco Walk Of Fame. When the International Motorsports Hall of Fame inducted Farmer, they had to waive their rule of 5 years of retirement – they figured he never would retire. Red Farmer was inducted into the NASCAR Hall of Fame in 2022.

Helicopter crash
On July 12, 1993, Farmer was a passenger in a helicopter crash at Talladega Superspeedway that took the life of NASCAR Winston Cup driver Davey Allison, which occurred as Allison was attempting to land the aircraft in a nearby parking lot. The two were en route to the track in order to watch David Bonnett (son of fellow Alabama Gang driver Neil Bonnett) drive in a practice session. Farmer suffered a broken collarbone and fractured ribs in the crash, and was at the time of Allison's death in critical but stable condition.

Motorsports career results

NASCAR
(key) (Bold – Pole position awarded by qualifying time. Italics – Pole position earned by points standings or practice time. * – Most laps led.)

Grand National Series

Winston Cup Series

Daytona 500

Busch Series

ARCA Re/Max Series
(key) (Bold – Pole position awarded by qualifying time. Italics – Pole position earned by points standings or practice time. * – Most laps led.)

References

External links

Alabama Gang website
Talladega Walk of Fame

ARCA Menards Series drivers
Survivors of aviation accidents or incidents
International Motorsports Hall of Fame inductees
Living people
NASCAR drivers
Sportspeople from Birmingham, Alabama
Racing drivers from Alabama
1932 births
Alabama Gang
NASCAR Hall of Fame inductees